Al Mesbar Studies & Research Center is a Dubai based cultural phenomena think tank concentrating on the study of Islamic Movements. The Center focuses on "contemporary Islamic Movements, their thoughts and practices, symbolisms and ideologies and especially those that have [an] historic impact which is still in effect today".  It was founded in 2007 by Turki Bin Abdullah Aldakhil. Al-Mesbar Centre tries to materialize this transformation process through its various cultural, research and specialized scientific activities. Al-Mesbar Centre pays special attention to studying contemporary Islamic movements in order to unveil the nature of these constructive movements, observe their relations with other movements and their interaction with their milieu, presenting an anticipatory view to its future on all levels, and a view of the future of the nation away from calls of isolation and extremism. The core of the business is driven from its main monthly activity which is called Al-Mesbar Monthly Book; a monthly publication specialized in studying contemporary Islamic movements. This publication is distributed by subscription to leaders and decision makers, in the Arab world region, on a monthly basis, and available to public readers after some period of time.

Leadership and Staff 
The current chairman is also its founder, Saudi Arabian journalist Turki Bin Abdullah Aldakhil, who was also one of the founders of Al Arabiya News Channel.

Its general manager and a member of the editorial board is another Saudi Arabian journalist, Islamic legal scholar, and television producer Abdulah Bin Bijad Al Otaibi. Another editorial board member is controversial writer Mansour Alnogaidan. Al Mesbar employs around 20-30 further research staff.

Programs 
In line with its goals and priorities, Al Mesbar organises specialist seminars and conferences with the aim of spreading awareness of the issues covered amongst a wider public audience. It produces material across a range of media to reach as wide of an audience as possible. The Centre strives to achieve several goals within its scope of business, some of the priority goals are:         
 Spread scientific and subjective awareness on the Islamic Movements, their symbolism, thoughts and relations, through specialized scientific researches produced in the Centre’s monthly book and other various publications and activities. 
 Developing the public awareness as an essential milestone in the total development of one’s nation as the Centre believes that any civilization starts and ends with humans themselves. 
 Reviving the modern and enlightened Arabic cultures and never submitting to the literary stalemate and intolerance and dealing with identity discourses from a creative and effective humane approach, away from hatred and isolation. 
 Organizing seminars, interactive activities, and specialized training sessions in various scopes related to cultural, religious, and development matters, locally and internationally. The Centre welcomes any suggestions in this matter and will cooperate with any entity or establishment or person that will assist in accomplishing these goals as per the guidelines of the Centre. 
 Empowering the publics’ modern and civil cultures through cooperation with decision makers and concerned establishments. 
 Specialized studies in various economic, cultural, and intellectual components of the environment in an attempt to improve and develop these areas at different levels. The Centre also presents and provides strategic studies that allow everyone to create a better future.

The Center's principal publication is its Al-Mesbar Monthly Book that usually covers a major topic of Political Islam from a variety of perspectives. Topics covered include European Islamism, the Muslim Brotherhood, Hamas, Al-Qaeda in the Arabian peninsula, religious education as well as many lesser known Islamist groups that are spread across the wider Middle East.

List of Books 

 Al Sororia Movement, January 2007 
 Al Ahbash (ABYSSENIANS), February 2007
 Non-Violence, March 2007 (available to the public)
 Secularism, April 2007 (available to the public)
 Ancestral Holy War (Alsalafiah Al Jihadiah), May 2007 (available to the public)
 Algeria Salvation Front, June 2007 (available to the public)
 Malaysian Islamist, July 2007 (available to the public)
 Liberation Party (Hizb Al Tahreer), August 2007 (available to the public)
 Iraq Shiite, September 2007 (available to the public)
 Al–Qaida Organization in Arab Peninsula, October 2007 
 Islamic Movement in Morocco, November 2007
 Muslim Brothers 1 – Foundation, December 2007
 Muslim Brothers 2 – Challenges, January 2008
 The Contemporary Salafi – Albinism, February 2008 (available to the public)
 Hizbullah, March 2008
 European Islamism, April 2008 (available to the public)
 The marginalized, May 2008 (available to the public)
 Kurds Islamic Movement, June 2008 (available to the public)
 Yemen Islamic Current movements, July 2008
 Hamas Movement, August 2008 
 The Islamic Group in Egypt, September 2008 (available to the public)
 The Islamic Sunni in Lebanon, October 2008 (available to the public)
 Alsafawia, November 2008 (available to the public)
 The Qaeda 1 - The Formation, December 2008 
 The Jihad Group in Egypt, January 2009
 Al-Qaida: Expansion, February 2009
 Jihad Movement in Palestine, March 2009
 Tunisian Islamists, April 2009
 Jordanian Islamists, May 2009
 The Religious Institutes, June 2009 (available to the public)
 Yemen Shitte, July 2009 (available to the public)
 Muslim Brothers in Syria, August 2009
 The Islamic Movement In Israel, September 2009
 Turkish Movement, October 2009 (available to the public)
 Tabligh Group, November 2009
 Islamists Revision (Part One), December 2009
 Islamists Reviews – Part 1, January 2010
 Aljameya, February 2010
 Religious Education 1 – Description, March 2010 (available to the public)
 Religious Education 2 – Analysis, April 2010
 Muslim Brotherhood in Iraq, May 2010
 Islamists in Somalia, June 2010 
 The Muslim Brotherhood and the Salafis in the Gulf, July   2010 (available to the public)
 Al-Qaeda in Yemen, August 2010
 Islamists in the Gulf - issues, September 2010
 Sunnis in Iran, October 2010
 Islamic Feminism - The struggle for justice, November 2010
 Islamists in Sudan from establishment to separation, December 2010

See also
Hani Nasira

References 

Think tanks based in the United Arab Emirates
2007 establishments in the United Arab Emirates
Think tanks established in 2007